Balasubramanian Gopal (born 1970) is an Indian structural biologist, molecular biophysicist and a professor at the Molecular Biophysics Unit of the Indian Institute of Science. He is known for his studies on cell wall synthesis in Staphylococcus aureus and is an elected fellow of the National Academy of Sciences, India, Indian National Science Academy and the Indian Academy of Sciences. He received the National Bioscience Award for Career Development of the Department of Biotechnology in 2010. The Council of Scientific and Industrial Research, the apex agency of the Government of India for scientific research, awarded him the Shanti Swarup Bhatnagar Prize for Science and Technology, one of the highest Indian science awards, in 2015, for his contributions to biological sciences.

Biography 
Balasubramnian Gopal, born on 31 August 1970, completed his master's degree at Indian Institute of Technology, Kanpur and started his career as a biochemist by joining Torrent Pharmaceuticals at their Ahmedabad station. Later, he took a break from his job and joined the Indian Institute of Science (IISc) from where he secured a PhD. Moving to the UK, he did his post-doctoral studies in crystallography at the National Institute for Medical Research. Returning to India, he joined the Molecular Biophysics Unit of IISc as a member of Lab 301 where he and his colleagues are engaged in researches on structural and mechanistic aspects of membrane-associated proteins involved in inter-cell communication, transcriptional regulation and mediate antimicrobial resistance.

Gopal is known to have done considerable research in molecular biophysics and has contributed to widening our understanding of the cell wall synthesis in Staphylococcus aureus, a common gram-positive bacterium found in human respiratory tract and skin. He has published his research findings as articles in peer-reviewed journals and Google Scholar, an online article repository has listed 77 of them. He has delivered keynote addresses at several seminars including the Graduate Students' Meet 2007 and the 2nd International Conference on Structural and Functional Genomics organised by Sastra university, Tanjore in August 2016.

Awards and honors 
The Department of Biotechnology awarded him the National Bioscience Award for Career Development in 2010. The Indian Academy of Sciences elected him as its fellow in 2013, the same year as he was elected as a fellow by the National Academy of Sciences, India. He was awarded the Shanti Swarup Bhatnagar Prize for Science and Technology, one of the highest Indian science awards, by the Council of Scientific and Industrial Research in 2015. The elected fellowship of the Indian National Science Academy reached him in 2016.

Selected bibliography

See also 
 Staphylococcus aureus

Notes

References

External links 
 

Recipients of the Shanti Swarup Bhatnagar Award in Biological Science
1970 births
Living people
Indian molecular biologists
Structural biologists
Molecular biophysics
Indian scientific authors
IIT Kanpur alumni
Indian Institute of Science alumni
Academic staff of the Indian Institute of Science
Fellows of the Indian Academy of Sciences
Fellows of the Indian National Science Academy
Scientists from Bangalore
Fellows of The National Academy of Sciences, India
N-BIOS Prize recipients
20th-century Indian biologists